City of London Freemen's School (CLFS) is a co-educational private school for day and boarding pupils, located at Ashtead Park in Surrey, England. It is the sister school of the City of London School and the City of London School for Girls, which are both independent single-sex schools located within the City of London itself. All three schools receive funding from the City's Cash. The school's head is a member of the Headmasters' and Headmistresses' Conference.

The Good Schools Guide described the school as "A traditional academic and sporty school in a stunning setting with impressive facilities but not at all elitist – in fact quite the opposite."

History 
The school was founded in 1854 by the Corporation of London, and was originally located in Brixton, London to educate orphans of the freemen of the city. It is still possible for such orphan children to be educated as "Foundationers" at the school with the costs of their education borne by the City of London Corporation.

The school celebrated its 150th Anniversary in 2004 with a year long series of events. The Anniversary started with a service of thanksgiving at St Paul's Cathedral attended by the whole school (now numbering over 800) and culminated in the school being represented with a float in the annual Lord Mayor’s Show.

Houses

The School has three Houses: Gresham, Hale and Whittington (colours green, red and blue respectively). These are named after the influential Londoners and school benefactors Sir Thomas Gresham, Warren Stormes Hale and Richard Whittington. Pupils are assigned to a House as they start at the school and they stay in it throughout the school. Since it is now predominantly a day school and there are limited numbers of boarders, houses do not have the same connotations as in traditional independent schools being used solely for Inter-House Competitions and weekly House Assemblies. If a siblings are assigned to the same house.

Boarding house 

The boarding house is located in a new building located next to the new music block and the junior school.

Old Freemen's 
Once pupils leave school they become part of Old Freemen’s Association, which includes the Old Freemen's Rugby Football Club, Cricket Club and Hockey Club. There is also a Guild of Scholars of the City of London, which was formed to encourage former pupils from the three ‘City Schools’ to develop links with The City of London. Membership is open to all former pupils, staff, and retired staff, who must have obtained their ‘Freedom of the City of London’ but there is no subscription.

In addition any pupil aged 14–17, who is still at school may apply to become an Apprentice to a Freeman of the City at little cost and minimal commitment. They will then be entitled, at the age of 21, to apply for the Freedom of the City and membership of the Guild of Scholars. This Apprenticeship will be of particular interest to those who wish to pursue a career in the city. Annual events are organised to promote fellowship among the members, including an annual dinner and visits to places of interest.

Drama and music
The school organises a number of performances each year, and these have included Oliver!, Oklahoma!, Cabaret, Les Misérables and Into the Woods. The latest addition to this list is Sweeney Todd: The Demon Barber of Fleet Street, which was performed in December 2009. The senior school musical for 2011 was "Evita". The latest production was of Road by Jim Cartwright.

Catering 
The catering is currently provided by the contract caterers Sodexo.

Feeder schools
 Danes Hill School, Oxshott
 Homefield Preparatory School, Sutton
 Downsend School, Ashtead
 Kingswood House School, Epsom
 Milbourne Lodge School, Esher
 Aberdour School, Burgh Heath

Notable former pupils

Former pupils are known as Old Freemen. Some better known Old Freemen include:
 Rory Burns - Surrey and England cricketer
 Simon Cowell (presenter) - MBE, presenter of Animal Planet and Wildlife SOS
 Warwick Davis - actor, star of Willow, also appeared in the Star Wars and Harry Potter movie series
 Andrew Garfield - actor appeared in the films Red Riding, Boy A and Lions for Lambs as well as the plays Romeo & Juliet, The Laramie Project, Kes and the Channel 4 show Sugar Rush, The Social Network and The Amazing Spider-Man 
 Andrew Goddard - gastroenterologist
 Ashley Mote - former UKIP MEP
 Anders Nielsen - badminton player
 Alexandra Rickham - Paralympic sailor
 Guy Spier - investor
 Joe Strummer-lead singer of punk rock band the Clash. Strummer's real name was John Mellor (died December 2002)
 Gavin Turk -  one of the Young British Artists
 Andy Ward - progressive rock drummer best known for playing in Camel in the 1970s

References

External links
Official website
Profile at the Good Schools Guide
Cityoflondon.gov.uk

Boarding schools in Surrey
Private schools in Surrey
History of the City of London
Member schools of the Headmasters' and Headmistresses' Conference
Educational institutions established in 1854
1854 establishments in England
Freedom of the City